Christophe Béchu (born 11 June 1974) is a French politician who has been serving as Minister for Ecological Transition and Cohesion of the Territories in the government of Prime Minister Élisabeth Borne since 2022.

Béchu previously was the President of the General Council of the Maine-et-Loire department from 2004 to 2014. He briefly served as a Member of the European Parliament from 2009 until 2011, representing the West France constituency. A former member of the centre-right Union for a Popular Movement, later the Republicans (LR), and the DL, Béchu became the secretary general of Horizons in 2021.

Béchu briefly served as Minister of Relations with Local Authorities from 20 May to 4 July 2022.

Political career
Béchu has represented the Canton of Angers-Nord-Ouest since 2001, and was re-elected there during the 2008 French cantonal elections. However, he was narrowly defeated by the incumbent PS mayor of Angers, Jean-Claude Antonini, in the 2008 municipal elections.

Member of the European Parliament, 2009–2011
In 2009, the UMP selected him to lead the UMP list in the West constituency ahead of the 2009 European elections. He was elected to the European Parliament as a result. His list won 27.16% of the vote and three MEPs. In parliament, he served on the Committee on Agriculture and Rural Development. In addition to his committee assignments, he was part of the parliament's delegation for relations with Japan. He resigned in January 2011.

Béchu lost the regional election of 2010 to become President of Pays de la Loire region, but was elected as a regional councillor. In the 2011 elections, he was elected as a Senator of Maine-et-Loire, and thereafter resigned from regional council of Pays-de-Loire.

Mayor of Angers, 2014–2022
During the 2014 French municipal elections, Béchu competed against Frédéric Béatse, incumbent, and became the new mayor of Angers on 4 April 2014. Béchu was re-elected in 2020.

In 2016, Béchu caused controversy when he requested the removal of posters that had been installed as part of a governmental HIV/AIDS prevention campaign "not to expose a young public to a message they cannot understand“; at the time, Minister of Health Marisol Touraine denounced Béchu as "homophobe."

Other activities
 Agence de financement des infrastructures de transport de France (AFITF), chair of the board of directors 
 Dexia Crédit Local, member of the board of directors (2007–2009)

Political positions
In 2019, Béchu publicly declared his support for incumbent President Emmanuel Macron.

In 2022, Bechu sponsored regulations to re-allow lark hunting in France. This is after previous regulations were struck down as being a violation of EU law.

References

1974 births
Living people
People from Angers
Liberal Democracy (France) politicians
The Republicans (France) politicians
Modern and Humanist France
French Senators of the Fifth Republic
Mayors of places in Pays de la Loire
MEPs for West France 2009–2014
Union for a Popular Movement MEPs
Sciences Po alumni
Senators of Maine-et-Loire
Horizons politicians
Members of the Borne government